The Indian Car of the Year Award (ICOTY) is presented annually to the best new car launched in India, and is based on similar other awards such as European Car of the Year. The award was established in 2006, with the Maruti Suzuki Swift winning the first award and the Kia Carens winning the latest award in 2023.

Hyundai has won the award seven times, while Maruti Suzuki four times and Honda have won twice. Swift is the only car model to win the award three times. Most of the award-winning cars have been from Japanese or Korean manufacturers, and are available globally in the same or different guises. The Hyundai Elite i20 and i10 Grand, for instance, are available in Europe and Japan. The European Renault Duster developed by the Renault engineers, sold worldwide and built in India yet got this award for 2013. The Maruti brand on Suzuki models is exclusive to India. The Honda City is largely restricted to Asian and South American markets, while the Ford Figo is a modified version of the Ford Fiesta that was sold in Europe from 2002 to 2008. The Honda Civic is a global model, although not all versions are sold on every market.

ICOTY also awards the Premium Car Award, first awarded in 2019 for luxury and performance cars and the Green Car Award, first awarded for hybrid and electric cars in 2021.

Rules 
All new car models qualify for the award, however cars which have minor changes such as cosmetic face lifts or minor mechanical changes do not qualify for the award. The car has to be manufactured or assembled in India and has to be on sale before 30 November of the previous year. The car should be approved for the Indian market by the official authority however CBU's (Completely Built Unit) which are imported are not considered for the award.

For the Premium Car Award, luxury and performance cars priced above the ₹40 lakh are considered including cars which come through the CBU route. Green Car Award takes in consideration hybrid and electric cars and also include cars which come through the CBU route.

Voting process 
The voting jury consists automobile journalists from all over India. Each jury member has a maximum of 25 points, where each member can allot a maximum of 10 points to one car. And every Jury member must give points to at least 5 of the contending cars.

Results

Indian Car of the Year

Winners by Year

Winners by manufacturers

Premium Car Award

Winners by Year

Winners by manufacturers

Green Car Award

Winners by Year

Winners by manufacturers

See also
 Car of the Year
 List of motor vehicle awards

References

Motor vehicle awards